Brian Bowman may refer to:

Brian Bowman (born 1946), American musician
Brian Bowman (politician) (born 1971), Canadian politician